Marlon Bryan Duran Lopez (born January 25, 1992) is an American soccer player who currently plays for Dallas City FC.

Career
Duran made his professional debut for Aguila on September 25, 2012, coming on as a sub in the 60th minute in a 3-0 loss to Toronto FC in the CONCACAF Champions League.

References

External links

Dayton University bio

1992 births
Living people
American soccer players
American expatriate soccer players
Dayton Flyers men's soccer players
C.D. Águila footballers
Expatriate footballers in El Salvador
United States men's youth international soccer players
American sportspeople of Salvadoran descent
Association football midfielders
Soccer players from Texas
IMG Academy alumni
People from Duncanville, Texas